Prahlad Singh Patel (born 28 June 1960) is an Indian politician who is the current Minister of State for Food Processing Industries and Jal Shakti of India  from 7 July 2021. He is a Member of Parliament from Damoh Loksabha Constituency in Madhya Pradesh. He was minister of state for coal in Third Vajpayee Ministry. He was first elected to 9th Lok Sabha in 1989 and again re-elected to 11th Lok Sabha in 1996 (2nd term), 13th Lok Sabha in 1999 (3rd term) from Balaghat, 16th Lok Sabha in 2014 (4th term) and 17th Lok Sabha in 2019 (5th term) from  Damoh. He was born in Narsinghpur and is an advocate by profession. He is a graduate of the Government Science College, Jabalpur.

Career

Prahlad Singh Patel who is BJP Represent person he was elected as MP for first time from Madhya Pradesh constituency, In May 2019, Patel became the Minister of State (Independent Charge) for Culture and Tourism.

He  was elected to the Lok Sabha, lower house of the Parliament of India from Damoh, Madhya Pradesh in the 2019 Indian general election as member of the Bharatiya Janata Party. Prahalad Singh Patel is an eminent leader of LODHI (KSHATRIYA) Rajput community.

References

External links 
 Ministry of Culture biography
 Ministry of Tourism
 Parliament of India page
 Cabinet list

People from Narsinghpur district
People from Balaghat district
Living people
1960 births
India MPs 2014–2019
India MPs 1999–2004
Lok Sabha members from Madhya Pradesh
Bharatiya Janata Party politicians from Madhya Pradesh
India MPs 1989–1991
India MPs 1996–1997
India MPs 2019–present
Narendra Modi ministry
Culture Ministers of India